Serikin is a small Bidayuh town in Kuching Division, Sarawak, Malaysia. The town is located about 15 km from Bau town and 80 km from Kuching city. Serikin is located on the border of Indonesia and Malaysia. Serikin is called Kampung Jagoi Serikin by the local residents.

Serikin is well known among locals and tourists for its weekend market. Held on each Saturday and Sunday, the market attracts many who come to buy goods from sellers from Indonesia. Serikin Weekend Market was started in 1992.

Located nearby are Kangang Waterfall and Tuboh Waterfall.

Climate
Serikin has a tropical rainforest climate (Af) with heavy to very heavy rainfall year-round.

References

Towns in Sarawak